A solar telescope is a special purpose telescope used to observe the Sun. Solar telescopes usually detect light with wavelengths in, or not far outside, the visible spectrum. Obsolete names for Sun telescopes include heliograph and photoheliograph.

Professional solar telescopes
Solar telescopes need optics large enough to achieve the best possible diffraction limit but less so for the associated light-collecting power of other astronomical telescopes. However, recently newer narrower filters and higher framerates have also driven solar telescopes towards photon-starved operations. Both the Daniel K. Inouye Solar Telescope as well as the proposed European Solar Telescope (EST) have larger apertures not only to increase the resolution, but also to increase the light-collecting power.

Because solar telescopes operate during the day, seeing is generally worse than for night-time telescopes, because the ground around the telescope is heated which causes turbulence and degrades the resolution. To alleviate this, solar telescopes are usually built on towers and the structures are painted white. The Dutch Open Telescope is built on an open framework to allow the wind to pass through the complete structure and provide cooling around the telescope's main mirror.

Another solar telescope-specific problem is the heat generated by the tightly-focused sunlight. For this reason, a heat stop is an integral part of the design of solar telescopes. For the Daniel K. Inouye Solar Telescope, the heat load is 2.5 MW/m2, with peak powers of 11.4 kW. The goal of such a heat stop is not only to survive this heat load, but also to remain cool enough not to induce any additional turbulence inside the telescope's dome.

Professional solar observatories may have main optical elements with very long focal lengths (although not always, Dutch Open Telescope) and light paths operating in a vacuum or helium to eliminate air motion due to convection inside the telescope. However, this is not possible for apertures over 1 meter, at which the pressure difference at the entrance window of the vacuum tube becomes too large. Therefore, the Daniel K. Inouye Solar Telescope and the EST have active cooling of the dome to minimize the temperature difference between the air inside and outside the telescope.

Due to the suns narrow path across the sky, some solar telescopes are fixed in position (and are sometimes buried underground), with the only moving part being a heliostat to track the Sun. One example of this is the McMath-Pierce Solar Telescope.

Selected solar telescopes

 The Einstein Tower (Einsteinturm) became operational in 1924
 McMath-Pierce Solar Telescope (1.6 m diameter, 1961–)
 Andrei Severny Solar Telescope (90 cm diameter, 1954–) in Crimea
 Multi-purpose automated solar telescope (80 cm diameter) in Republic of Buryatia, Russia
 Large solar vacuum telescope (76 cm diameter, 1980-) on the coast of lake Baikal, Russia
 McMath-Hulbert Observatory (24"/61 cm diameter, 1941–1979)
 Swedish Vacuum Solar Telescope (47.5 cm diameter, 1985–2000)
 Swedish 1-m Solar Telescope (1 m diameter, 2002–)
 Richard B. Dunn Solar Telescope (0.76 m diameter, 1969–)
 Mount Wilson Observatory
 Dutch Open Telescope (45 cm diameter, 1997–)
 The Teide Observatory hosts multiple solar telescopes, including
 the 70 cm Vacuum Tower Telescope (1989–) and
 the 1.5 m GREGOR Solar Telescope (2012–]).
 Goode Solar Telescope (1.6 m, 2009-)
 Chinese Large Solar Telescope (CLST) (180 cm diameter, 2019–)
 Daniel K. Inouye Solar Telescope (DKIST), a telescope with 4m aperture.
 European Solar Telescope (EST), a proposed 4-meter class aperture telescope.
 Chinese Giant Solar Telescope (CGST), a proposed 5-8 meter  aperture telescope.
 National Large Solar Telescope (NLST), is a Gregorian multi-purpose open telescope proposed to be built and installed in India and aims to study the Sun's microscopic structure.

Other types of observation
Most solar observatories observe optically at visible, UV, and near infrared wavelengths, but other solar phenomena can be observed — albeit not from the Earth's surface due to the absorption of the atmosphere:
 Solar X-ray astronomy, observations of the Sun in x-rays
 Multi-spectral solar telescope array (MSSTA), a rocket launched payload of UV telescopes in the 1990s
 Leoncito Astronomical Complex operated a submillimeter wavelength solar telescope.
 The Radio Solar Telescope Network (RSTN) is a network of solar observatories maintained and operated by the U.S. Air Force Weather Agency.
 CERN Axion Solar Telescope (CAST), looks for solar axions in the early 2000s

Amateur solar telescopes

In the field of amateur astronomy there are many methods used to observe the Sun. Amateurs use everything from simple systems to project the Sun on a piece of white paper, light blocking filters, Herschel wedges which redirect 95% of the light and heat away from the eyepiece, up to hydrogen-alpha filter systems and even home built spectrohelioscopes. In contrast to professional telescopes, amateur solar telescopes are usually much smaller.

With a conventional telescope, an extremely dark filter at the opening of the primary tube is used to reduce the light of the sun to tolerable levels. Since the full available spectrum is observed, this is known as "white-light" viewing, and the opening filter is called a "white-light filter". The problem is that even reduced, the full spectrum of white light tends to obscure many of the specific features associated with solar activity, such as prominences and details of the chromosphere (i.e., the surface). Specialized solar telescopes facilitate clear observation of such H-alpha emissions by using a bandwidth filter implemented with a Fabry-Perot etalon.

See also
 List of solar telescopes
 List of telescope types
 Heliostat

References

External links

 *
 CSIRO Solar Heliograph part 2
 Solar Gallery of an amateur astronomer
 Solar Gallery of the Hong Kong Astronomical Society
 

 
Astronomical instruments
Telescope